Uzbekistan competed in the Summer Olympic Games as an independent nation for the first time at the 1996 Summer Olympics in Atlanta, United States. Previously, Uzbek athletes competed for the Unified Team at the 1992 Summer Olympics. 71 competitors, 63 men and 8 women, took part in 70 events in 12 sports.

Medalists

Athletics

Men's 100 metres
Anvar Kuchmuradov

Men's 110m Hurdles
Yury Aristov

Men's Triple Jump
Yevgeniy Petin

Men's Decathlon 
 Ramil Ganiyev 
 Final Result — 8318 points (→ 8th place)

 Oleg Veretelnikov
 Final Result — did not finish (→ no ranking)

Men's Shot Put
Sergey Kot

Men's Discus Throw 
 Roman Poltoratskiy
 Qualification — 51.96m (→ did not advance)

Men's Hammer Throw 
 Vitaliy Khozhatelev
 Qualification — 64.52m (→ did not advance)

Men's Javelin Throw
Sergey Voynov
Vladimir Parfyonov 

Women's 100 metres
Lyudmila Dmitriady

Women's 200 metres
Lyudmila Dmitriady

Women's High Jump
 Svetlana Munkova
 Qualification — 1.80m (→ did not advance)

Boxing

Men's Featherweight (– 57 kg)
Ulugbek Ibragimov
 First Round — Defeated Naramchogt Lamgen (Mongolia), RSC-2
 Second Round — Lost to Falk Huste (Germany), 4-8

Men's Lightweight (– 60 kg)
Mahammatkodir Abdoollayev
 First Round — Lost to Terrance Cauthen (United States), 6-18

Men's Welterweight (– 67 kg)
Nariman Atayev
 First Round — Defeated Ashira Evans (Kenya), 15-10
 Second Round — Defeated Nourbek Kassenov (Kyrgyzstan), 11-7
 Quarterfinals — Lost to Daniel Santos (Puerto Rico), 15-28

Men's Light-Middleweight (– 71 kg)
Karim Tulaganov →  Bronze Medal
 First Round — Defeated Oscar Gomez (Argentina), RSC-3 (02:50) 
 Second Round — Defeated Yared Wolde (Ethiopia), 13-9
 Quarterfinals — Defeated Rival Cadeau (Seychelles), RSC-1 (1:24) 
 Semifinals — Lost to David Reid (United States), 4-12

Men's Middleweight (– 75 kg)
Dilshod Yarbekov
 First Round — Defeated Brian Johansen (Denmark), RSC-3 (02:47) 
 Second Round — Defeated Ludovik Plachetka (Czech Republic), 4-4
 Quarterfinals — Lost to Rhoshii Wells (United States), 8-8, judges cards

Men's Light-Heavyweight (– 81 kg)
Timur Ibragimov
 First Round — Defeated Rostyslav Zaulychnyi (Ukraine), 7-3
 Second Round — Lost to Stipe Drvis (Croatia), 9-10

Men's Heavyweight (– 91 kg)
Ruslan Chagaev
 First Round — Lost to Luan Krasniqi (Germany), 4-12

Canoeing

Cycling

Fencing

One male fencer represented Uzbekistan in 1996.

Men's foil
 Rafkat Ruziyev

Gymnastics

Judo

Shooting

Swimming

Men's 50m Freestyle
 Ravil Nachaev
 Heat – 23.93 (→ did not advance, 45th place)

Men's 200m Freestyle
 Vyacheslav Kabanov
 Heat – 1:53.36 (→ did not advance, 28th place)

Men's 100m Butterfly
 Ravil Nachaev
 Heat – 56.61 (→ did not advance, 48th place)

Men's 200m Butterfly
 Dimitri Pankov
 Heat – 2:05.36 (→ did not advance, 38th place)

Men's 200m Individual Medley
 Oleg Pukhnatiy
 Heat – 2:06.39 (→ did not advance, 24th place)

Men's 4 × 100 m Freestyle Relay
 Ravil Nachaev, Oleg Tsvetkovskiy, Oleg Pukhnatiy, and Vyacheslav Kabanov
 Heat – 3:28.33 (→ did not advance, 17th place)

Men's 4 × 200 m Freestyle Relay
 Vyacheslav Kabanov, Aleksandr Agafonov, Dmitriy Pankov, and Oleg Tsvetkovskiy
 Heat – 7:40.60 (→ did not advance, 12th place)

Tennis

Men's Singles Competition:
 Dmitri Tomashevich
 First round — Lost to Karol Kučera (Slovakia) 3-6, 6-2, 0-6

 Oleg Ogorodov
 First round — Defeated Sándor Noszály (Hungary) 7-5, 7-6
 First round — Lost to MaliVai Washington (United States) 3-6, 4-6

Weightlifting

Wrestling

References

External links
Official Olympic Reports
International Olympic Committee results database

Nations at the 1996 Summer Olympics
1996
Olympics